Paulius Šiškevičius (born 7 September 1993 in Vilnius) is a Lithuanian former racing cyclist.

Major results

2010
 National Junior Road Championships
1st  Road race
1st  Time trial
2011
 National Junior Road Championships
1st  Road race
1st  Time trial
2012
 1st  Road race, National Under-23 Road Championships
2013
 1st  Road race, National Under-23 Road Championships
2014
 1st  Road race, National Road Championships
2015
 National Under-23 Road Championships
1st  Road race
1st  Time trial
 10th Omloop van het Waasland
2016
 National Road Championships
2nd Time trial
3rd Road race
 4th Overall Tour d'Oranie
 7th Overall Tour de Blida
2017
 1st Stage 8 Tour du Maroc
 6th Road race, National Road Championships
2018
 6th Time trial, National Road Championships

References

External links

1993 births
Living people
Lithuanian male cyclists